Professional Wrestling Just Tap Out (JTO) is a Japanese professional wrestling promotion and training facility owned and promoted by Taka Michinoku. The promotion places emphasis on a style of puroresu that combines high-flying, submission wrestling and martial arts. Most matches are held under submission-only rules.

The promotion was founded by Michinoku after his previous promotion, Kaientai Dojo (now Active Advance Pro Wrestling) dismissed him after he was involved in a cheating scandal. They held their first show on July 8, 2019 in Korakuen Hall.

Unlike most professional wrestling promotions, their top honor isn't a championship. Instead, wrestlers compete in tournaments and ranking matches, with the top ranking ('King of JTO' for men and 'Queen of JTO' for women) considered the highest honor. Those honors are currently held by Taka Michinoku & Tomoka Inaba respectively.

The promotion holds partnerships with various other promotions from the Japanese independent scene such as World Wonder Ring Stardom. Tomoka Inaba and Aoi are two of JTO's wrestlers who appeared in several events promoted by Stardom such as Stardom New Blood 1 and New Blood 2.

Roster

Current championships 

King of JTO Championship 

The King of JTO Championship is the top title of the Professional Wrestling Just Tap Out promotion. There have been a total of five reigns shared between four different champions. The current title holder is Yasu Urano who is in his first reign.

Combined reigns 

Queen of JTO Championship 

The Queen of JTO Championship is the female's title of the Professional Wrestling Just Tap Out promotion. There have been a total of four reigns shared between three different champions. The current title holder is Tomoka Inaba who is in her second reign.

Combined reigns 

Tournaments

References

External Links 
 

2019 establishments in Japan
Entertainment companies established in 2019
Japanese professional wrestling promotions